Charles Henry "Red" Barrett (February 14, 1915 – July 28, 1990) was a Major League Baseball pitcher who played 11 total career seasons in the National League. He played for the Cincinnati Reds, Boston Braves and St. Louis Cardinals. He pitched the shortest complete game by fewest pitches (58) in history.

He died at the age of 75 in Wilson, North Carolina.

Career
Barrett was right-handed. He stood 5'11" and weighed 183 lbs. Playing for three teams over 11 years, Barrett was a .500 pitcher, winning and losing 69 games. Career totals for 253 games include 149 games started, 67 complete games, 11 shutouts, 62 games finished, and 7 saves. His lifetime ERA was 3.53.

On August 10, 1944, throwing for the Boston Braves against his former team the Cincinnati Reds, Barrett pitched a 2–0 shutout at Crosley Field. He faced 29 batters (two more than the minimum, having surrendered two hits, walked no one and struck out no one, with no defensive errors behind him), setting a complete game (and a nine-inning game) record by throwing only 58 pitches, an average of exactly two pitches per batter. It was also the shortest night game in history, and the shortest road-team win in history, lasting just 1 hour and 15 minutes. The game was umpired behind home plate by the noted umpire Jocko Conlan.

In 1945, he led the Cardinals to second place in the National League, posting a team best 21 wins and 9 losses. For the year, his combined 23–12 record for the Braves and Cardinals with a 3.00 earned run average led the league in wins. He was named to the AP National League All-Star team and finished third in NL Most Valuable Player voting.

As a member of the St. Louis Cardinals, Barrett appeared on the cover of Life Magazine on April 1, 1946.

In 1948, Barrett was a relief pitcher for the Braves in two games of the World Series, allowing no runs in  innings.

See also
List of Major League Baseball annual wins leaders

References

External links

 

1915 births
Saint Leo College Preparatory School alumni
1990 deaths
Major League Baseball pitchers
Boston Braves players
Cincinnati Reds players
St. Louis Cardinals players
National League All-Stars
National League wins champions
Baseball players from California
Ponca City Angels players
Muskogee Reds players
Syracuse Chiefs players
Indianapolis Indians players
Birmingham Barons players
Nashville Vols players
Los Angeles Angels (minor league) players
Buffalo Bisons (minor league) players
Tampa Smokers players
Toronto Maple Leafs (International League) players
Paris Indians players
Sportspeople from Santa Barbara, California
People from Wilson, North Carolina
Saint Leo University alumni
International League MVP award winners